Jericho Sirens is the fourth studio album by American post-hardcore band Hot Snakes. It was released in March 2018 under Sub Pop.

Track listing

References

2018 albums
Hot Snakes albums
Sub Pop albums